Tavewa is an island of the Yasawa Islands, measuring approximately 3 kilometres long by 1 km wide. It is part of the Nacula District that lies north-west of the Fijian island of Viti Levu.

Island supplies and logistics 

Tavewa does not have a pier; all supplies have to be loaded onto small landing boats from supply ships stopping between the islands. Depending on the arrival times of the supply boats and the tides, all goods have to be unloaded from the landing boats in places in the water in front of the beach. The residents unload and carry all goods from knee- to breast-deep water onto the beach. From there, the goods are either transferred into wheelbarrows or carried to their destination.

In 2004, there were no motorised vehicles on Tavewa, not even a tractor. Tavewa has no roads, only paths.

Diesel for the generators is transported this way in jerry cans, which explains why the generators are only used as required.

The regular supplies, with the tourists, arrive with the Yasawa Flyer, which operates a daily water-bus service between Nadi and Tavewa. Other supply boats exists that operate either on an infrequent-but-regular or ad-hoc basis.

There are three shared phone lines between Tavewa and the mainland. Marine radio is a common communication platform.

Drinking water 

As has the rest of Fiji, Tavewa has been experiencing a drought since the middle of the 1990s. Drinking water is a precious resource. Drinking water for tourists is brought in plastic bottles on the supply boats. The large number of non-degradable plastic bottles that are land-filled on the relatively small island are expected to cause environmental problems in the future.

Use of salt water 

All resorts operate only salt-water showers. While the generators are running, salt-water is pumped into black water tanks on top of the showers. The sun heats the water in the tanks. Salt-water is also used for laundry and certain other purposes not requiring potable water.

Tourism 

Tavewa caters nearly exclusively for the back-packing community. The island is not very highly developed, affording visitors a realistic insight into the Fijian and Pacific Islands lifestyle.

Tavewa is not connected to any centralised power grid. The resorts on the island operate their own power supplies consisting of diesel-powered generators. These generators are only used on demand, usually starting at sunset. At around 10:00 pm the generators are shut down, and campfires and lanterns produce light.

The few cooling facilities rely on ice-blocks, which are regenerated while the generators are on.

Resorts 

There are three resorts on Tavewa:
 Otto and Fanny's Resort
 David's Place Resort
 Coral View Resort

All resorts are built in the traditional Fijian bure style. Amenities, such as restaurants and dining halls, are shared and central, making the resorts resemble campuses. Tourist accommodation is either in dormitories or smaller couple- or family-sized bures.

There is a scuba-diving school on Tavewa.

Local population 

The island's people support themselves mainly by tourism. In addition to Tavewa residents, the population includes many resort staff who commute from nearby islands in the Yasawa group or from Nadi. The locals live in bures like those at the resorts. Cooking is usually communal, on fireplaces dotted around the bures.

Transport 

Tavewa can be regularly reached either by the Yasawa Flyer ferry or the Turtle Airways seaplane.

The vast majority of tourists and supplies arrive on the Yasawa Flyer. It takes the Flyer about four hours to travel between Nadi and Tavewa, with several stops at the island resorts in-between.

Yasawa Islands
Ba Province
Islands of Fiji